Olgierd Moskalewicz  (born 16 February 1974 in Połczyn Zdrój) is a Polish professional soccer player who last plays for Pogoń Szczecin.

Career

Club
In 2001, he had a brief spell with Diyarbakırspor in the Turkish Super Lig, appearing in two league matches.

National team
Moskalewicz made one appearance for the Poland national football team against Iceland in 2000.

References

External links
 

1974 births
Living people
Polish footballers
Polish expatriate footballers
Poland international footballers
Pogoń Szczecin players
Widzew Łódź players
Wisła Kraków players
Zagłębie Lubin players
Arka Gdynia players
RKS Radomsko players
Diyarbakırspor footballers
Expatriate footballers in Turkey
AEL Limassol players
Expatriate footballers in Cyprus
Ekstraklasa players
Süper Lig players
Cypriot First Division players
People from Połczyn-Zdrój
Sportspeople from West Pomeranian Voivodeship
Association football midfielders